Eli Winch (April 20, 1848 – December 10, 1938) was an American manufacturer and politician.

Born in Wilmington, Essex County, New York, Winch moved with his family to Rubicon, Wisconsin and then to Fond du Lac, Wisconsin. Winch farmed in Charlestown, Wisconsin. He then worked for the Webster Manufacturing Company of Menasha, Wisconsin in 1872 and was the superintendent of the hub and spoke factory for the Webster Manufacturing Company in Marshfield, Wisconsin. While living in Marshfield, Winch served in the Wisconsin State Assembly in 1905, and was a Republican. Winch died in Palm Beach, Florida.

Notes

External links

1848 births
1938 deaths
People from Wilmington, New York
People from Charlestown, Wisconsin
People from Rubicon, Wisconsin
People from Marshfield, Wisconsin
Businesspeople from Wisconsin
Farmers from Wisconsin
Republican Party members of the Wisconsin State Assembly